is a 2009 Japanese gore film. It was directed by Yoshihiro Nishimura and Naoyuki Tomomatsu and premiered at the New York Asian Film Festival in June 2009. It is based on a manga of the same name by Shungiku Uchida.

Plot 
In a typical Tokyo high school a perpetually teenage vampire named Monami (Yukie Kawamura) falls for her classmate, Mizushima (Takumi Saito), who happens to already be the reluctant boyfriend to the vice principal/science professor's daughter, Keiko (Eri Otoguro), a leader of a Sweet Lolita gang. The ensuing love triangle leads Keiko to seek the assistance of her father who, unbeknown to his daughter, moonlights as a Kabuki-clad mad scientist with the school nurse as his assistant. The pair experiment on students in the school basement hoping to discover the secret of reanimating corpses (akin to the work of Victor Frankenstein). Their hopes are answered when they discover a solution of Monami's blood holds the properties to bring life to dead body parts and inanimate objects.

The story begins to unfold after Mizushima carelessly accepts a honmei choco spiked with Monami's blood, turning him into a half vampire. When Keiko discovers their secret, she attacks Monami but accidentally throws herself off the school roof in the process. Her premature death leads to her father using the blood solution to transform her into a vicious Frankenstein's monster determined to get revenge against Monami. From then on Monami and Keiko battle each other in the pursuit of winning Mizushima's heart, regardless of his feelings towards either of them. Monami ultimately kills Keiko by using her powers to turn droplets of her blood into spikes that rip the flesh off the latter's body and leaves her skeleton impaled at the top of Tokyo Tower. At the end Keiko's father turns himself in a Franken Advanced Composite Life Form with use of Monami's blood, and it is revealed that Igor was turned into a vampire by Monami a hundred years ago, and that Mizushima is only one in a long succession of boyfriends.

Cast

Subculture references 
The film parodies subcultures prevalent in Japan, including ganguro and Lolita. Wrist cutting is a theme that returns from Nishimura's 2008 film, Tokyo Gore Police.

Release
In the United States, the film was released on 26 June 2009 from American Film Market.

References

External links 
 
 Vampire Girl vs Frankenstein Girl - The Official Anime Website from FUNimation

2009 films
2009 horror films
Live-action films based on manga
Films directed by Naoyuki Tomomatsu
Films directed by Yoshihiro Nishimura
Funimation
Japanese coming-of-age films
Mad scientist films
Japanese vampire films
2000s Japanese films